This and That is a studio album by Pat Boone, released in 1960 on Dot Records.

Track listing

References 

1960 albums
Pat Boone albums
Dot Records albums